The Swaythling and Bassett Covenant of Churches is an ecumenical group made up of the following churches:

 All Saints' Church, Bassett
 Church of the Immaculate Conception
 Swaythling Baptist Church 
 Swaythling Methodist Church, Burgess Road
 St. Alban's, Burgess Road
 St. Mary's, South Stoneham
 St. Nicolas', North Stoneham
 St. Michael and All Angels, Bassett Avenue

Bassett and Swaythling are districts of Southampton.

External links 
 Swaythling Baptist Church
 Swaythling Methodist Church
 Swaythling Parish
 Bassett Parish
 Immaculate Conception Church

Christian organisations based in the United Kingdom
Churches in Southampton